Hesperapis rufipes is a species of hairy-footed bee in the family Melittidae. It is found in North America.

References

Further reading

 

Melittidae
Articles created by Qbugbot
Insects described in 1899